Eginhard  was the bishop of Utrecht around the year 845.

All that is known of Eginhard is an immunity certificate given by emperor Lothair I from 21 March 845, in which he is mentioned as bishop of Utrecht

Bishops in the Carolingian Empire
Bishops of Utrecht